In organic chemistry, mandelonitrile is the nitrile of mandelic acid, or the cyanohydrin derivative of benzaldehyde. Small amounts of mandelonitrile occur in the pits of some fruits.

Occurrence 
Mandelonitrile is the aglycone part of the cyanogenic glycosides prunasin and amygdalin.

The naturally occurring (R)-(+) enantiomer finds use as an intermediate in the preparation of optically active α-hydroxy carboxylic acids, α-hydroxy aldehydes, α-hydroxy ketones, and 2-amino alcohols.

Mandelonitrile can break down into cyanide and benzaldehyde, a reaction that can be catalyzed by the enzyme mandelonitrile lyase.

Preparation
Racemic mandelonitrile may be prepared similar to many other cyanohydrins. In a one pot reaction, benzaldehyde is reacted with sodium bisulfite to give the corresponding adduct, which further reacts with aqueous sodium cyanide to give the racemic product:

References 

Cyanohydrins